J. Marshall Brown (October 3, 1926 – August 5, 1995) was an American poltician. He served as a Democratic member of the Louisiana House of Representatives.

Life and career 
Brown was an insurance agent.

In 1952, Brown was elected to the Louisiana House of Representatives, serving until 1960. 

Brown died in August 1995 in a traffic accident, at the age of 68.

In 2014, Brown was posthumously inducted into the Louisiana Political Museum and Hall of Fame.

References 

1926 births
1995 deaths
Democratic Party members of the Louisiana House of Representatives
20th-century American politicians
Insurance agents